Sir Alexander Carew (30 August 160823 December 1644) was an English landowner, soldier and politician from Antony, Cornwall. Elected Member of Parliament for Cornwall in November 1640, he voted for the execution of the Earl of Strafford in May 1641, and supported the removal of bishops from the Church of England.

When the First English Civil War began in August 1642, he was one of the relatively few members of the Cornish gentry who backed Parliament. In March 1643, he was appointed commander of St Nicholas' Island, a key defensive position for Plymouth. He was arrested in August, after attempting to switch sides, and taken to London.

In a demonstration of Parliament's commitment to winning the war, he was executed for treason in December 1644, followed in January by Sir John Hotham, his son John Hotham the younger, and Archbishop Laud. His half-brother, John Carew, was executed as a regicide in October 1660.

Personal details
Alexander Carew was born on 30 August 1608, the eldest surviving son of Sir Richard Carew, 1st Baronet (c. 1580–1643), and his first wife, Bridget Chudleigh (ca 1584–1612). In 1621, Sir Richard remarried, this time to Grace Rolle (1606–1655); their four sons included John Carew, who signed the death warrant for Charles I, and was executed for treason, in October 1660. Richard Carew was a moderate Puritan, who was more interested in education, inventions, and breeding cats; in August 1641, he purchased a baronetcy, a method used by Charles I to raise money.
 
In 1631, Alexander married Jane Rolle (1606–1679); they had five children who lived to adulthood, Bridget, Mary, Joan, John, and Richard.

Career

Although there is no record of which university he attended, in 1628 Carew entered the Middle Temple to acquire legal training, then considered part of a gentleman's education. Like his father and grandfather before him, in November 1640 Carew was elected Member of Parliament for Cornwall. He supported the removal of bishops from the Church of England, and voted for the execution of the Earl of Strafford in May 1641. He reportedly claimed "If I were sure to be the next man, that should suffer upon the same scaffold, with the same axe, I would give my consent."

When the First English Civil War began in August 1642, Carew was one of the relatively few members of the Cornish gentry who openly supported Parliament, and was appointed to numerous committees as a result. After succeeding his father in March 1643, he was made a member of the Cornish Sequestration Committee, and commander of St Nicholas' Island, a key defensive position for Plymouth. Many went to war in 1642 expecting a single, decisive battle; by 1643, it was clear this was incorrect, and Parliamentarians like Carew whose estates lay in occupied territory faced financial ruin. 

The summer of 1643 was the highpoint of Royalist success, and by August they controlled the entire West Country with the exception of Plymouth and Exeter. Carew's cousin James Chudleigh, leader of Parliamentarian forces in Devon, switched sides after being captured at Stratton in May, and he himself now opened negotiations to do the same. In August, he ordered his men to open fire on a Parliamentarian warship entering harbour; they refused, and he allegedly escaped lynching only after the ship's captain intervened on his behalf.

Accused of treason, Carew was held in the Tower of London, and expelled from Parliament. As the war grew more bitter, both sides began using martial law to prosecute senior officers who had defected. In August 1644, Parliament established a military tribunal to try those suspected of treachery; in November, Carew was sentenced to death, along with the former commander of Hull, Sir John Hotham, and his son. These sentences were supported by those like Oliver Cromwell, who felt the war risked being lost due to lack of commitment.

His wife petitioned Parliament, who dismissed her claim that he was "in a kind of distracted condition and unfit to die", but gave him a month to arrange his affairs. He was executed on Tower Hill in December 1644, followed in January by the Hothams, and Archbishop Laud; held since 1641, it was widely believed he was put to death to please the Scots Covenanters. Carew was buried in the graveyard attached to St Augustine's Tower, Hackney.

His social standing seemed unaffected either by his execution, or that of his half-brother in 1660; John inherited title and estates, and he and Richard both served as MPs. Of their three sisters, Mary married John Sparke (1636-1680), MP for Plymouth, Joan married Walter Kendall, MP for Lostwithiel. Bridget's husband was John Pendarves of Roscrow; their son Alexander was an MP from 1689 to 1725.

References

Sources
 
 
 
 
 
 
 

|-

1644 deaths
1608 births
People from Antony, Cornwall
Baronets in the Baronetage of England
Members of the pre-1707 English Parliament for constituencies in Cornwall
English MPs 1640–1648
Roundheads
Alexander
English politicians convicted of crimes
Executed Cornish people
People executed by Stuart England by decapitation
17th-century executions by England
Carew baronets